Fleming Stadium is a sports stadium in Wilson, North Carolina. It is primarily used for baseball and is the home of the Wilson Tobs of the Coastal Plain League. It opened in 1939 and has a capacity of 3,000 people.

The grounds are also home to the North Carolina Baseball Museum. It also has bricks with names of the donors right in front of the museum.

The stadium has been used by teams in several different minor leagues over the decades, including the Class D Coastal Plain League, the Bi-State League, and the Carolina League. The Carolina Mudcats used the ballpark as their temporary home in 1991, before opening Five County Stadium at Zebulon in mid-season.

North Carolina Baseball Museum
The North Carolina Baseball Museum is a museum located in Wilson, North Carolina that honors those past and present Major League Baseball players and Negro league players from the state of North Carolina. The museum contains vintage baseball cards, memorabilia, books, and other baseball memorabilia.

The museum has a main focus on 7 National Baseball Hall of Famers that were born in North Carolina. These players include Luke Appling, Rick Ferrell, Jim "Catfish" Hunter, Gaylord Perry, Buck Leonard, Enos Slaughter, and Hoyt Wilheim. A separate room contains baseball memorabilia of the state's colleges and local high schools. The museum also provides focus on Negro league players such as Buck Leonard and women in baseball. Other signed memorabilia can also been seen throughout the museum.

The museum hosts an annual Hot Stove Dinner as a fundraiser. The first speaker of the annual dinner was Stan Musial. The museum is located at Fleming Stadium which is the home of Wilson Tobs, a collegiate summer league team in the Coastal Plain League.

References

External links
Info about the ballpark
North Carolina Baseball Museum
2014 TV story about the ballpark's 75th anniversary

Minor league baseball venues
Wilson, North Carolina
Baseball venues in North Carolina
Buildings and structures in Wilson County, North Carolina
1939 establishments in North Carolina
Sports venues completed in 1939
North Carolina Baseball Museum
North Carolina Baseball Museum